The South West Hampshire & South East Dorset Green Belt is a green belt environmental and planning policy that regulates the rural space in the South West region of England. It is mainly within the county of Dorset, extending cross border into Hampshire. Essentially, the function of the belt is to control development expansion in the South East Dorset conurbation and outlying towns and villages. It is managed by local planning authorities on guidance from central government.

Geography
Much of this is within the Dorset Council unitary authority area, with smaller portions within the Bournemouth, Christchurch and Poole (BCP) unitary area.

The New Forest district in Hampshire holds several portions of green belt, and the boundary of those are mainly contiguous with the New Forest National Park. Due to the belt lying across county borders, responsibility and co-ordination lies with the aforementioned local unitary and district councils as these are the local planning authorities.

See also
 Green belt (United Kingdom)

References

External links
 Interactive map of green belt land

Green belts in the United Kingdom
Environment of Dorset
Environment of Hampshire